Et la lumière fut (internationally released as And Then There Was Light) is a 1989 French drama film written and directed by Otar Iosseliani. 

The film entered the competition at the 46th Venice International Film Festival, where it received the Special Jury Prize.

Cast 
Sigalon Sagna as Badinia
Saly Badji as Okonoro
Binta Cissé as Mzezve
Marie-Christine Dieme as Lazra
 Fatou Seydi as Kotoko

References

External links

1989 films
French drama films
Films directed by Otar Iosseliani
Venice Grand Jury Prize winners
1980s French films